Members of the New South Wales Legislative Assembly who served in the 47th parliament held their seats from 1981 to 1984. They were elected at the 1981 state election, and at by-elections. The Speaker was Laurie Kelly.

See also
Fourth Wran ministry
Fifth Wran ministry
Sixth Wran ministry
Results of the 1981 New South Wales state election (Legislative Assembly)
Candidates of the 1981 New South Wales state election

References

Members of New South Wales parliaments by term
20th-century Australian politicians